Commander Adama could refer to:
Commander Adama (original Battlestar Galactica), from the original Battlestar Galactica
William Adama, Commander from the new Battlestar Galactica
Lee Adama, son of William Adama